Nikolay Krasnikov is a Russian twenty times ice speedway world champion.   

Krasnikov won eight consecutive Individual Ice Speedway World Championship titles from 2005 until 2012 and twelve Team Ice Racing World Championship titles with Russia from 2004 until 2016. He is regarded as one of the leading ice speedway riders of all-time.

References

1985 births
Living people
Russian speedway riders
Ice Speedway World Champions
Sportspeople from Ufa